Diversity  as seen in sociology and political studies is the degree of differences in identifying features among the members of a purposefully defined group, such as any group differences in racial or ethnic classifications, age, gender, religion, philosophy, physical abilities, socioeconomic background, sexual orientation, gender identity, intelligence, mental health, physical health, genetic attributes, personality, behavior or attractiveness.

When measuring human diversity, a diversity index exemplifies the likelihood that two randomly selected residents have different ethnicities. If all residents are of the same ethnic group it is zero by definition. If half are from one group and half from another, it is 50. The diversity index does not take into account the willingness of individuals to cooperate with those of other ethnicities.

International human rights

The Convention on the Rights of Persons with Disabilities affirms to "respect difference and acceptance of persons with disabilities as human diversity and humanity" for protection of human rights of persons with disabilities.

Ideology

Political creeds which support the idea that diversity is valuable and desirable hold that recognizing and promoting these  diverse cultures may aid communication between people of different backgrounds and lifestyles, leading to greater knowledge, understanding, and peaceful coexistence. For example, "Respect for Diversity" is one of the six principles of the Global Greens Charter, a manifesto subscribed to by Green parties from all over the world. In contrast to diversity, some political creeds promote cultural assimilation as the process to lead to these ends.

Use in American academy
This use of diversity in this sense  also extends to American academy, where in an attempt to create a "diverse student body" typically supports the recruitment of students from historically excluded populations, such as students of African-American or Latino background as well as women in such historically underrepresented fields as the sciences.

Business and workplace 
Corporations make commitments to diversity in their personnel both for reasons of brand halo and competitive advantage, but progress is slow.

Gender in Politics 
Historically, women have been underrepresented in politics compared to men. Women's rights movements, such as feminism, have addressed the marginalization of women in politics.

Race in Politics

United States 
In American politics, white men have often been represented more compared to people of color. There has only been one black president, Barack Obama. All U.S. presidents, except Obama, have been white men. In other sections of U.S. politics, the number of people of color represented has gradually increased each year since the 20th Century.

See also

 Acceptance
 Affirmative action
 Cultural diversity
 Discrimination
 Diversity training
 Gender diversity
 Heterodox Academy (viewpoint diversity in academy)
 Identity politics
 Individual and group rights
 Motto of the European Union
 Multiculturalism
 Neurodiversity
 Racial diversity
 Racial segregation
 Rainbow flag
 Sexual diversity
 Workplace diversity

References

External links

Linguistic controversies
Affirmative action
Identity politics